Bachtiar Aly is a professor from Indonesia who majored in Communication and Politics. He was the Indonesian Ambassador for Egypt from 2002–2005. From 2014 to 2019, he was member of the People's Representative Council under the Nasdem Party.

Biography 
Aly studied journalism at Padjadjaran University, Bandung. He continued his studies in Germany, where he obtained a masters and a doctorate degree Germany in 1983. In 1984, he began writing some communications books in Indonesia. He is now a lecturer in Communication studies at The University of Indonesia, Jakarta.

In 2017, he warned that social media will decrease solidarity and bring a higher sense of individualism.

References 

Living people
Year of birth missing (living people)
Padjadjaran University alumni
Academic staff of the University of Indonesia
Indonesian journalists
Ambassadors of Indonesia to Egypt
Place of birth missing (living people)